This is a list of people who served as Lord Lieutenant of Ayrshire, Scotland. The post was abolished in 1975, being replaced by the Lord Lieutenant of Ayrshire and Arran.

Archibald Montgomerie, 11th Earl of Eglinton 17 March 1794 – 30 October 1796
Hugh Montgomerie, 12th Earl of Eglinton 23 November 1796 – 14 December 1819
George Boyle, 4th Earl of Glasgow 7 January 1820 – 15 August 1842
Archibald Montgomerie, 13th Earl of Eglinton 15 August 1842 – 4 October 1861
Archibald Kennedy, 2nd Marquess of Ailsa 4 December 1861 – 20 March 1870
John Dalrymple, 10th Earl of Stair 15 June 1870 – 1897
George Arnulph Montgomerie, 15th Earl of Eglinton 1897 – 10 August 1919
Archibald Kennedy, 3rd Marquess of Ailsa 16 November 1919 – 1937
Sir Charles Fergusson, 7th Baronet 18 February 1937 – 1950
Sir Geoffrey Hughes-Onslow 17 July 1950 – 1969
Sir James Fergusson, 8th Baronet 7 April 1969 – 25 October 1973
Col. Bryce Muir Knox 5 March 1974 – 1975

Deputy Lieutenants

 James Baird Thorneycroft 12 April 1901 
 James Archibald Campbell 12 April 1901

Notes and references 

Ayrshire
East Ayrshire
North Ayrshire
South Ayrshire
Ayrshire